Desulfobacterium  is a rod-shaped bacteria genus from the family of Desulfobacteraceae. Desulfobacterium occur widespread in brackish and marine sediments.

References

Further reading 
 
 
 
 
 
 
 

Desulfobacterales
Bacteria genera